Jamie Barton may refer to:

 Jamie Barton (singer) (born 1981), American mezzo-soprano singer
 Jamie Barton (politician), member of the Pennsylvania House of Representatives